Alswede is a village in the East Westphalian borough of Lübbecke in Minden-Lübbecke district in the German state of North Rhine-Westphalia.

Politics 

 The parish chair of Alswede is Günther Vullriede.
 The local historian is Helmut Woelk.

(as at July 2008)

Gallery

References and footnotes

External links 
Website of the town of Lübbecke 
Website of the village of Alswede (DGA)

Lübbecke
Minden-Lübbecke